Ctenucha togata is a moth of the family Erebidae. It was described by Herbert Druce in 1884. It is found in Mexico, Guatemala, Panama and Costa Rica.

References

togata
Moths described in 1884